Zila Khan is an Indian Sufi singer and actor. She sings classical and semi-classical musical forms and performs in the tradition of Imdadkhani gharana. She has acted in Bajirao Mastani a film by Sanjay Leela Bhansali and also actively acts in theatrical plays like Gauhar. She is a playback singer for Bollywood films and advertisements. Zila stands for Freedom in Education and Gender Equality. She is a composer and music director. Zila also produced and directed a documentary called Spirit To Soul on her father Ustad Vilayat Khan.

Early life and career 
Zila Khan is the daughter of Ustad Vilayat Khan the legendary sitarist and is his formal disciple. She was named by her father on the raag Zila Kaafi of Amir Khusrau.

Zila Khan was empowered by her father from a young age. He taught her for fourteen to sixteen hours a day and she has mastered all his compositions. Zila Khan's musical heritage spans seven generations of Indian classical musicians and five generations of recorded music.

She has performed in every major Indian and International Music Festival and venues such as: 
•	Lincoln Center 
•	Kennedy Center
•	Symphony Space, Broadway
•	MTV Coke Studio
•	MTV IGGY
•	Trafalgar Square
  
She has great command over various music styles such as Indian Classical, Semi-Classical, Sufi, Folk & Bhakti Sangeet. She sings in 8 different languages and has also sung 'Western Concertos' in English, Latin, Persian & Arabic. She has also performed at several Jazz Festivals with leading artists from an array of genres and cultures. In Sufi Music style, she performs with her vast range of qaul, qalbana, gul, and now is dedicating time for the revival of traditional Ghazal singing. Her performances have the guiding presence of the gayaki tradition.

Music Therapy through UstadGah Foundation Centre and Fortis Hospital, Zila Khan is a Music Therapist and Consultant. She started the first Music Therapy wing in India. The department is dedicated towards collecting and analysing research data which will be used to treat certain ailments in patients and people all over the world who need supportive treatment or even for regular good health like Yoga.
Acting in a lead role in a Musical Play – Gods, Graves & Grandmothers, Zila role was that of the Grandmother on which the play was based on. She sang 14 songs in various genres of Indian Semi Classical, Bollywood, Classical, Folk and Sufi music.

In 2004 the Ministry of External Affairs had asked Zila Khan to make a documentary on the life of her father, the legendary Sitar maestro Ustad Vilayat Khan. It is called Spirit to Soul.
The documentary also shows a clipping of Ustad Vilayat Khan making Zila Khan his student/shagird  and successor in a formal ceremony.

Zila Khan is regularly invited to perform at President and Prime Ministerial level receptions on multiple occasions by the Indian Government. She has performed for former President APJ Kalam, President Pratibha Patil and also for former Prime Minister Dr. Manmohan Singh, who presented her with the 'Roll of Honor'. She was awarded the Ghalib Award.

Being a representative of Indian Heritage and Culture, Zila is one of the select artists who has featured in the Incredible India advertisement campaign for the Tourism Ministry of India. She regularly invited to go on delegations abroad with the Indian Government; and is also an official member of the organising committee of the Commonwealth Games.

Zila Khan is a dedicated composer and has selected many songs from Sufi and contemporary poets.
She was featured in the multi-producers episode of Coke Studio @ MTV Season 2.

Music school
UstadGah Foundation was established in 2008 by Zila Khan, its aim is to teach and groom under privileged children who are musically talented. The foundation provides students with scholarships and helps build a musical base, vision and capability to earn their livelihood through music, and showcase India's Culture and Heritage nationally and internationally.

Personal life
Zila Khan has a son Faizan Shaikh Khan. 
With Faizan's background and training first from his grandfather Ustad Vilayat Khan and then his mother Zila Khan, they have together created a music production called The Fez Project The project showcases Classical and Sufi music which is merged with more popular genres like Electronic, Acoustic, Flamenco etc. to promote, attract/involve and form a connect with the youth. They also tour through various universities to speak to young students about the project through lecture-demonstrations and concerts. It has currently been established as a digital property which aims to attract more of the youth to start listening to classical music.
Faizan is the only grandchild of Ustad Vilayat Khan who has learned sitar and vocal music from him and has been under his guidance and lived with him for 12 years until Ustad Vilayat Khan died in 2004.

Awards
 Roll of Honour received from the Prime Minister of India

Discography
 Ishq Ki Nayee Bahar
 Zila – Classical and Semi-Classical renditions.
 99.9FM – Bollywood Film
 Secrets of the Divine- in which Zila Khan has composed all the songs.
 The Realm of the Heart
 Sar Masti – A tribute to Amir Khusrau
 Zila The girl child – Hazrat Rabia Basri's Sufi'ism historical recording in musical form for the first time in music.
 Sing with Sufis
 Vasl (title song of drama ost)
 Tere Ishq mein (title song of Man o Salwa ost)
 Braveheart – A Tribute to Women

References

Living people
Performers of Sufi music
Indian women classical singers
Year of birth missing (living people)
Singers from Kolkata
Indian Sufis
21st-century Indian singers
21st-century Indian women singers
Women musicians from West Bengal